Yeda Peak is a volcano and the highest peak of the Spectrum Range in the Boundary Ranges of northwestern British Columbia, Canada, located  southwest of Tatogga and  south of Kitsu Peak. It is believed Yeda Peak last erupted during the Pliocene period.

See also
 List of volcanoes in Canada
 List of Northern Cordilleran volcanoes
 List of mountains of Canada
 Volcanism of Canada
 Volcanism of Western Canada

External links
Yeda Peak in the Canadian Mountain Encyclopedia

Mount Edziza volcanic complex
Two-thousanders of British Columbia
Pliocene volcanoes